The 1998–99 Slovenian Second League season started on 15 August 1998 and ended on 13 June 1999. Each team played a total of 30 matches.

League standing

See also
1998–99 Slovenian PrvaLiga
1998–99 Slovenian Third League

References

External links
Football Association of Slovenia 

Slovenian Second League seasons
2
Slovenia